Xiao Weijie (born 20 February 2003) is a Chinese footballer currently playing as a defender for Hainan Star, on loan from Wuhan Three Towns.

Career statistics

Club
.

References

2003 births
Living people
Chinese footballers
China youth international footballers
Association football defenders
Wuhan Three Towns F.C. players